Tagish Lake is a lake in Yukon  and northern British Columbia, Canada.

It has two arms, the Taku Arm in the east which is very long and mostly in British Columbia and Windy Arm in the west, mostly in Yukon. The Klondike Highway runs along Windy Arm south of Carcross. Bennett Lake flows into Tagish Lake, so the northern portion of Tagish Lake was part of the route to the Klondike used by gold-seekers during the Klondike Gold Rush.

The meteorite
On January 18, 2000, a carbonaceous chondrite meteorite now known as "Tagish Lake", fell on the frozen surface of the Taku Arm. A number of fragments were recovered and studied by researchers from the University of Calgary, University of Western Ontario, and NASA; the meteorite currently resides in the University of Alberta meteorite collection.

The name
The lake is named for the Tagish people. Tagish means fish trap in the old Tagish language, an Athabascan language.
Other sources translate Tagish as "it (spring ice) is breaking up".

Fauna
Tagish lies in the path of migratory swans that come every spring to wait out the melting of the more Northern Lakes.

Tagish is also home to the Southern Lakes with trophy fishing.

References

Atlin District
Lakes of British Columbia
Lakes of Yukon
Yukon River